is an autobahn in Germany, connecting Saarlouis with Saarbrücken. Together with the BAB8, it serves as part of the connection between Luxembourg and Germany. As the major part of the BAB 620 is alongside the river Saar, one section in Saarbrücken, the so-called "Stadtautobahn" is subject to flooding several times a year. As a joke, locals call it "Bundesschifffahrtsstrasse" (Federal water lane) and "Nebenfluss der Saar mit 13 Buchstaben" (tributary of the Saar with 13 letters) because of that. A tunnel is being discussed to circumvent that problem.

Exit list 

 , 

 

|}

External links 

620
A620